North of South: An African Journey is a travel book by Shiva Naipaul, originally published by Penguin Books in 1978, and republished as a Penguin Classic in 1997. The book concerns Naipaul's travels in Kenya, Tanzania and Zambia. Naipaul was particularly interested in the Asian populations of these countries.  The "South" in the title refers to South Africa.

External links
 North of South: An African Journey preview from Google Books

African travel books
British travel books
English non-fiction books